Justin Driver is an American legal scholar. He is the Robert R. Slaughter Professor of Law and Counselor to the Dean at Yale Law School, where he has taught since 2019. Prior to joining the faculty at Yale, Driver taught at the University of Chicago Law School, where he was the Harry N. Wyatt Professor of Law. 

He is an elected member of the American Academy of Arts and Sciences and the American Law Institute. In 2021, Driver was appointed by President Joe Biden to serve on the Presidential Commission on the Supreme Court of the United States.

Early life and education

Justin Driver was raised in predominantly black neighborhood in Southeast Washington, D.C. As a child, he commuted across the city, to attend Alice Deal Middle School in the more affluent Chevy Chase neighborhood.

Driver earned his Bachelor of Arts degree with honors in Public Policy from Brown University in 1997. He subsequently earned a Master of Arts in Teaching from Duke University in 1998, a Master of Studies in Modern History from Magdalen College, Oxford in 2000, and a Juris Doctor from Harvard Law School in 2004. Driver served as a law clerk to Judge Merrick Garland on the United States Court of Appeals for the District of Columbia Circuit, and Justice Sandra Day O'Connor and Justice Stephen Breyer on the Supreme Court of the United States.

Career

Driver joined the University of Texas School of Law in 2009. He became the Harry N. Wyatt Professor of Law at the University of Chicago in 2014. Driver is a member of the American Law Institute and of the American Constitution Society’s Academic Advisory Board. Driver was an editor of The Supreme Court Review. On April 9, 2021, Driver was named to the Presidential Commission on the Supreme Court of the United States.

On May 26, 2022, it was reported that Connecticut Supreme Court justice Maria Araújo Kahn and two Yale Law School professors Cristina M. Rodríguez & Justin Driver were possibly being vetting for a vacancy on the United States Court of Appeals for the Second Circuit.

Recognition

 Elected Member, American Academy of Arts and Sciences, 2022
 Steven S. Goldberg Award for Distinguished Scholarship in Education Law, Education Law Association, 2020
 Elected Member, American Law Institute, 2017
 William Nelson Cromwell Article Prize, American Society for Legal History, 2013

Selected publications
 The Schoolhouse Gate: Public Education, the Supreme Court, and the Battle for the American Mind (2018)

References

Brown University alumni
Alumni of the University of Oxford
Harvard Law School alumni
University of Texas School of Law faculty
University of Chicago Law School faculty
Yale Law School faculty
Duke University alumni
Year of birth missing (living people)
Living people